Einsiedeln is a railway station in the Swiss canton of Schwyz and municipality of Einsiedeln. The station is the terminus of the Wädenswil to Einsiedeln railway line, which is owned by the Südostbahn. The station is served by Zurich S-Bahn services S13, to Wädenswil, and S40, to Rapperswil.

References

External links 
 
 

Railway stations in the canton of Schwyz
Südostbahn stations
Einsiedeln